Kenosha Engine was an automobile and engine factory in Kenosha, Wisconsin. First opened for automobile production in 1902 by the Thomas B. Jeffery Company and later operated by American Motors, the Kenosha Engine Plant saw all operations halted by Chrysler and it was permanently closed in October 2010 and demolished between December 2012 and April 2013.

History 
The factory was opened in 1902 by the Thomas B. Jeffery Company that evolved into Nash Motors in 1916, American Motors Corporation (AMC) in 1954, and was acquired by Chrysler in 1987.

Passenger vehicle production at the Lakefront and Kenosha Main plants were discontinued on December 23, 1988 (or mid - model year 1989). These were the L-Body Dodge Omni and Plymouth Horizon FWD models, as well as the M-body RWD sedans, Chrysler Fifth Avenue, Dodge Diplomat, and Plymouth Fury. The facility was downsized and continued to manufacture engines .

The opening of the 3.5-liter engine line, in 2002, came after the company invested $624 million in a  expansion of the plant.

In 2006, the Kenosha Engine factory employed 1,300 people. 

Kenosha Engine was one of Chrysler Group's Powertrain plants that scored at the top of their segment, according to the 2007 Harbour Report North America report, a broadly accepted measure of productivity in the automotive industry.

Significantly, Chrysler excluded employees of the Kenosha plant from its February 2, 2009 buyout offer for hourly workers. In May 2009, approximately 800 workers were employed at the plant.

On May 1, 2009, Chrysler announced that the Kenosha Engine plant was to close by the end of 2010 as a result of Chrysler's bankruptcy and restructuring plan.

In response to news about closing the Kenosha Engine plant, hundreds of auto workers held a rally in May 2009, and appealed to Obama administration officials, and to executives at both Fiat and Chrysler, to reverse the decision to shut down the facility. After Chrysler assets were transferred to a new corporation operated by Fiat as part of emerging from Chrysler Chapter 11 reorganization on June 10, 2009, the Kenosha Engine plant was restarted.

However, by August 2010, Chrysler announced the closure of the facility and its remaining 575 jobs. The end of 108 years of automaking in Kenosha arrived when the last engine was produced on October 22, 2010. At that time, the future of the engine plant site in the center of the city remained unknown, and Kenosha city officials were worried. The Old Carco Liquidation Trust, the owner of assets formerly held by Chrysler LLC, unsuccessfully tried to market the site to other industrial users. By October 2011, an agreement was reached to transfer ownership of the property to either the city or the state, with $10 million in federal Troubled Asset Relief Program (TARP) money available to help clean up environmental problems at the site. An auction was held in December 2011, for the machines and equipment in the Kenosha Engine plant under order of the United States Bankruptcy Court. It took three days to sell tools, ranging from drill bits to machine tools bigger than trucks, inside the plant.

Demolition of the plant complex began in late 2012. Cleanup was completed by the week of April 27, 2013. In February 2014, Old Carco Liquidation Trust abandoned the former Kenosha Engine Plant, and the city of Kenosha accepted title to the property. The city of Kenosha, Wisconsin Department of Health Services, United States Environmental Protection Agency, and Kenosha County Division of Health collaborated on environmental assessment, remediation, and preparation of the property for redevelopment.

Products
 AMC straight-6 engines
 AMC V8 engines
 1997–2010 PowerTech 2.7 L V6
 2003–2010 3.5 L V6

References 
 

American Motors
Chrysler factories
Motor vehicle assembly plants in Wisconsin
Buildings and structures in Kenosha, Wisconsin
Defunct manufacturing companies based in Wisconsin